Gaizka Toquero Pinedo (born 9 August 1984) is a Spanish  former professional footballer who played mainly as a right winger.

He spent most of his career with Athletic Bilbao, appearing in 207 competitive matches during seven La Liga seasons and scoring 24 goals, and becoming a fan favourite for his endeavour.

Club career

Early years
Toquero was born in Vitoria-Gasteiz, Álava. After a brief youth spell at Real Sociedad, and some years with both reserve teams of Deportivo Alavés where he had also featured in his formative years, he started playing professionally for SD Lemona in the 2006–07 season, later joining Basque neighbours Sestao River Club (both clubs were in the third division).

While playing for Sestao, Athletic Bilbao showed interest in acquiring Toquero, who eventually signed him in 2008. After not being part of Joaquín Caparrós' plans in pre-season, he was loaned to neighbouring SD Eibar greatly due to new manager Carlos Pouso, who had coached the player before.

Athletic Bilbao

After 15 matches in 2008–09's second level, Toquero was recalled by Athletic on 4 January 2009, making his La Liga debut six days later by appearing as a second-half substitute in a 1–1 home draw against RCD Espanyol. He scored his first goal for the team on 4 March in a 3–0 home win in the Copa del Rey over Sevilla FC (4–2 on aggregate) which qualified Athletic for the final: there, he opened the scoring, albeit in a 4–1 loss to FC Barcelona.

Blessed with few technical skills but a tremendous hard-worker – which earned him the affectionate nickname of Lehendakari– in 2009–10 Toquero blossomed into a first division player. He started most of the campaign as an attacking complement to Fernando Llorente, and also found the net on several occasions, notably a double against Real Valladolid on 7 March 2010 in a 2–0 home success.

Toquero once again was a regular starter for Athletic during 2010–11, opening his official goal account on 30 January 2011 by netting twice in a 2–0 win at Atlético Madrid. At the end of the following season, he came off the bench in both the UEFA Europa League and the Spanish Cup finals, both of which ended in 3–0 defeats; in October 2012 he renewed his contract, due to expire in June 2013, for three more years.

Toquero made one substitute appearance in the 2014–15 edition of the UEFA Champions League, in a 2–1 group stage away loss against FC BATE Borisov. His last game for the club (less than 50 minutes of action during the campaign) was in the dying moments of a 1–0 league win over Real Madrid, on 7 May 2015.

Alavés
On 10 July 2015, Toquero cut ties with Athletic and returned to Alavés four days later after agreeing to a two-year deal. He was an ever-present figure in his first season, scoring nine goals in 39 starts as the team returned to the top tier after a ten-year wait; he added 23 with one goal during the second, and played a part in their run to the domestic cup final, although he was an unused substitute in the showpiece match.

As his contract at Mendizorrotza Stadium was finally not renewed, Toquero decided to train with hometown minnows CD Aurrerá de Vitoria in the close season while considering his options for the future.

Zaragoza
On 4 August 2017, Toquero signed a one-year deal with second division club Real Zaragoza. On 29 May 2019, after nearly a year without playing an official match due to complications from a knee injury, the 34-year-old announced his retirement.

International career
Toquero did not represent Spain at any level. He played seven matches for the Basque Country representative side, and scored twice in a 6–1 win over Bolivia at the Anoeta Stadium on 29 December 2012.

Career statistics

Honours
Athletic Bilbao
Copa del Rey runner-up: 2008–09, 2011–12
Supercopa de España runner-up: 2009
UEFA Europa League runner-up: 2011–12

Alavés
Segunda División: 2015–16
Copa del Rey runner-up: 2016–17

References

External links

1984 births
Living people
Footballers from Vitoria-Gasteiz
Spanish footballers
Association football wingers
Association football forwards
La Liga players
Segunda División players
Segunda División B players
Tercera División players
Deportivo Alavés B players
SD Lemona footballers
Sestao River footballers
Athletic Bilbao footballers
Real Sociedad footballers
SD Eibar footballers
Deportivo Alavés players
Real Zaragoza players
Basque Country international footballers